Ma Wat Wai is a walled village in Lung Yeuk Tau, Fanling, Hong Kong. Ma Wat Wai and the adjacent village of Ma Wat Tsuen are part of the Five Wai (walled villages) and Six Tsuen (villages) in Lung Yeuk Tau.

Administration
Ma Wat Wai is a recognized village under the New Territories Small House Policy. It is one of the villages represented within the Fanling District Rural Committee. For electoral purposes, Ma Wat Wai is part of the Queen's Hill constituency, which is currently represented by Law Ting-tak.

Ma Wat Tsuen, as part of Lung Yeuk Tau, is also a recognized village under the New Territories Small House Policy.

History
At the time of the 1911 census, the population of Ma Wat Wai was 49. The number of males was 28.

Conservation
Ma Wat Wai is located along the Lung Yeuk Tau Heritage Trail. The Entrance Tower of Ma Wat Wai is a declared monument.

See also
 Walled villages of Hong Kong

References

External links

 Delineation of area of existing village Ma Wat Tsuen (Fanling) for election of resident representative (2019 to 2022) (includes Ma Wat Wai)
 Antiquities and Monuments Office. Hong Kong Traditional Chinese Architectural Information System. Ma Wat Wai

Walled villages of Hong Kong
Declared monuments of Hong Kong
Lung Yeuk Tau
Villages in North District, Hong Kong